Goniatites is a genus of extinct cephalopods belonging to the family Goniatitidae, included in the superfamily Goniatitaceae. Hibernicoceras and Hypergoniatites are among related genera.

Species

Description
The shell is generally globose with an open but narrow umbilicus, the surface commonly reticulate resulting from longitudinal lirae crossing transverse striae. The ventral lobe of the suture is rather narrow with a median saddle about or little less than half the height of entire lobe. The first lateral saddle is subangular to angular.

Distribution
Fossils of species within this genus have been found widespread in North America, Eurasia, and north Africa. In particular they have been found in the Triassic of Italy, United States, in the Permian of United States, in the Carboniferous of the Czech Republic, Germany, Ireland, Morocco, United Kingdom, United States, in the Mississippian of United States, as well in the Devonian of the Czech Republic, Spain, United States.

Gallery

References

 Miller, Furnish, and Schindewolf, 1957. Paleozoic Ammonoidea, Treatise on Invertebrate Paleontology, Part L. Geological Society of America.
 Genus Goniatites in GONIAT
Sepkoski, Jack Sepkoski's Online Genus Database – Cephalopoda

Carboniferous ammonites
Goniatitida genera
Goniatitidae
Fossils of the Czech Republic
Fossils of Ireland
Permian ammonites
Late Devonian first appearances
Late Devonian animals
Rhaetian extinctions